Air-Speed, Inc. was a commuter airline in the United States from the 1970s based at Hanscom Field in Bedford, Massachusetts. It began operations in 1974. Hanscom Field has no scheduled airline service today.

Destinations
Massachusetts
Bedford (Hanscom Field)
Boston (Logan International Airport)
New Jersey
Newark/New York City (Newark Liberty International Airport)
New York
White Plains (Westchester County Airport)
Pennsylvania
Philadelphia (Philadelphia International Airport)

See also
 List of defunct airlines of the United States

References
TimetableImages.com

Defunct airlines of the United States
Airlines established in 1974
Transportation in Middlesex County, Massachusetts
Defunct companies based in Massachusetts
1974 establishments in Massachusetts
Airlines based in Massachusetts